Trevor Bumstead is an English Association football coach. He holds the UEFA A License.

Coaching career

Southend United
Bumstead was born in Essex. He began coaching Southend United youth at their center of excellence in 2002 and was responsible for the Under 9's.

West Ham United
In 2004 Bumstead moved to West Ham United under Academy Manager Tony Carr as the Lead Youth Development Phase Coach, responsible for players between the Under 12 and Under 16 age groups. A number of players cite Bumstead as a major influence in their development, including Declan Rice, Reece Oxford,Sebastian Lletget and Grady Diangana.

Scottish Football Association
In July 2012, Bumstead headed a conference of over 120 coaches from across the country as part of the Scottish FA West Region Coaching Conference at Toryglen Regional Football Centre.

Arsenal
Bumstead joined Arsenal in 2014 under Academy Manager Andries Jonker initially to work with the Under 15s as head coach, before taking over the Under 16s. Throughout his time at the academy, he worked closely with future stars Bukayo Saka, Folarin Balogun, Emile Smith Rowe and Yunus Musah. In 2017 his Under 16 side won the Liam Brady Cup, beating Bayern Munich, Manchester United and Juventus respectively.

During his tenure with the Under 16s, several players and ex-players were assigned to work along side Bumstead and his team as they studied for their UEFA coaching licenses, most notably Mikel Arteta, Jack Wilshere, Per Mertesacker, Freddie Ljungberg and Thierry Henry.

Following the departure of Kwame Ampadu to AS Monaco in 2018, Bumstead took temporary charge of Arsenal U18 until a permanent replacement was found.

Buckswood School
Since 2019 He has been the Head of Football at Buckswood School.

References

External links
Buckswood School Academy Coaching Staff

1980 births
Living people
Association football coaches
West Ham United F.C. non-playing staff
Arsenal F.C. non-playing staff